Gennady Aleksandrovich Galkin (14 May 1934 – 11 April 1985) was a Soviet diver. He competed in the 10 m platform at the 1956 and 1960 Summer Olympics and finished in 13th and 6th place, respectively. He won a bronze medal in this discipline at the 1962 European Aquatics Championships, as well as five national titles in 1956, 1957, 1960, 1961 and 1963.

He graduated from the Moscow State University and held a PhD in physics.

References

External links
Profile at Infosport.ru 

1934 births
1985 deaths
People from Sobinsky District
Olympic divers of the Soviet Union
Divers at the 1956 Summer Olympics
Divers at the 1960 Summer Olympics
Soviet male divers
Moscow State University alumni